Sander Ketelaars (born 28 February 1979), better known by his stage name Sander van Doorn or the initials SvD, is a Dutch electro house DJ and record producer from Eindhoven.

Background 
Sander van Doorn began his recording career in 2004, releasing numerous tech-trance hits on Oxygen Recordings. He became a regular DJ at Ibiza's Judgement Sunday and the Gallery in London, and was featured on BBC Radio One's Essential Mix in 2006. He gained recognition as a popular remixer, shifting from remixing for trance producers to pop/rock artists such as the Arctic Monkeys, whose hit "When the Sun Goes Down" was remixed by van Doorn in 2007.

Musical style 
Sander van Doorn's musical style has ranged from tech-house and progressive house during the mid-2000s to more vocal-driven electro-house and EDM throughout the 2010s. Despite being more known for DJing, since 2006, he's been a regular presence on DJMag's Top 100 DJ surveys. Among his most notable remixes are Armin van Buuren's "Control Freak", Tiësto's "Dance4Life", Yello's "Oh Yeah", Sia's "The Girl You Lost to Cocaine", and Lady Gaga's "Marry the Night".

History

2007: Doorn Records and Best Breakthrough DJ 
He established his label Doorn Records in 2007, and released his debut album Supernaturalistic on Spinnin' Records. That same year, he won the award for "Best Breakthrough DJ" at the International Dance Music Awards held at the Winter Music Conference in Miami.

The first big achievement in his career was securing residencies at Judgement Sunday in Ibiza and at the Gallery in London. In June 2007, he presented one of Eddie Halliwell's shows on BBC Radio One. He also did an essential mix for BBC Radio One. His productions, both original work and remixes, in 2007-2008 have generally been well received in the electronic music industry and are supported by more than 50 radio stations worldwide. Notable artists he has done remixes for include Sia, The Killers, Swedish House Mafia, Depeche Mode, & many others. He also collaborated with Robbie Williams.

2008: Debut studio album 
On 3 March 2008, van Doorn released his first studio album via Spinnin' Records, a Dutch electronic dance music record label. The album was titled "Supernaturalistic" consisting of 13 tracks.

2010: Headlining music festivals 
In the summer of 2010, van Doorn had residency at the world-famous Amnesia nightclub in Ibiza, Spain. van Doorn headlined a lot of music festivals with Bal en Blanc 16 in Montreal, Beyond Wonderland in San Bernardino, Electric Zoo in New York City and Transmission in Prague. A month-long tour of North America, which started in April was a great success with the finale "Dusk Till Doorn" show at The Guvernment in Toronto. His tracks including "Renegade", "Daisy", "Reach Out", "Hymn 2.0" and "Daddyrock" topped the Beatport charts.

2011: Second studio album 
On 19 September 2011, he released his second studio album titled "Eleve11" via Spinnin' Records. In 2011, he performed at Energy, Mysteryland, EDC and started a residency at worldwide Sensation festivals. He also released his first true cross-over hits 'Love is darkness' and 'Koko'. Besides that, his Dusk till Doorn compilation got its 2011 version, all of which earned him a Dutch Silver Harp award.

2012: Collaboration with Mayaeni 
In 2012, his singles regularly topped the charts of online dance music retailer, Beatport. He collaborated with Detroit-based soul singer Mayaeni for the single "Nothing Inside". In March 2012, Sander performed at Ultra in Miami, where he introduced his new single "Nothing Inside" featuring Mayaeni. The song topped Beatport as well as the playlists and charts in numerous countries. In August 2012, it was announced that van Doorn and various notable electronic music producers would be featured on the Halo 4 remix album.

2013: Digitally Imported 
In 2013, he started a monthly program called "Identity" on internet dance music radio station Digitally Imported. It became a weekly show that currently broadcasts to more than 70 radio stations globally. He also released some hit songs like "Joyenegizer", "Neon", "Project T" (with Dimitri Vegas & Like Mike) and "Direct Dizko" (with Yves V). The program ended its broadcast after its 623rd show on 5 November 2021.

2014: Gold Skies 
In 2014, he collaborated with Martin Garrix and DVBBS for the single "Gold Skies". He also released "Right Here Right Now". In 2015, several more singles were released, including "Phoenix" (with R3hab) and "Rage" and collaborations with Firebeatz and Julian Jordan.

2016: The Snake 2016
Sander van Doorn started 2016 by releasing "Cuba Libre" followed by a collaboration with Gregor Salto for "Tribal". He then produced "Not Alone" inspired by the original track by Olive. "Raise Your Hands Up" with Chocolate Puma was released on Musical Freedom Records before "The Snake 2016" with Fred Pellichero. He ended 2016 with "WTF", collaborating with Oliver Heldens, which was released on Heldeep Records on 28 November.

2017: Return to trance and new album
Van Doorn released an album under his Purple Haze alter ego, Spectrvm, on 9 October 2017.

Discography

Albums

Charted singles

Other singles

Remixes and edits

Notes

References

External links
 Official website
 
 

1979 births
Living people
Club DJs
Dutch dance musicians
Dutch house musicians
Dutch DJs
Dutch record producers
Dutch trance musicians
Musicians from Eindhoven
Remixers
Progressive house musicians
Electronic dance music DJs